Héctor Miguel Cabrejos Vidarte, O.F.M. (born 5 July 1948) is a Peruvian prelate of the Catholic Church who has been the Archbishop of Trujillo since 1999. He has been a bishop since 1988 and currently heads the Latin American Bishops Council (CELAM).

Biography
Héctor Miguel Cabrejos Vidarte was born in Chota on 5 July 1948. He took his vows as a Franciscan on 29 June 1974 and on 7 December 1991 he was ordained a priest of that order.

On 20 June 1988, Pope John Paul II named him auxiliary bishop of Lima. He received his episcopal consecration on 7 August from Cardinal Juan Landázuri Ricketts, Archbishop of Lima. On 6 February 1996, Pope John Paul named him head of the Military Ordinariate of Peru and then on 29 July 1999 Archbishop of Trujillo. Pope John Paul appointed him to serve as a member of the Pontifical Commission for Latin America on 5 July 2004.

He was president of the Peruvian Bishops Conference from 2009 to 2012 and began serving another term in that in 2018. He was elected to a four-year term as president of the Latin American Bishops Council (CELAM) in May 2019.

He was a participant in the Synod of Bishops for the Pan-Amazon region in 2019. He was one of four Synod prelates elected on 7 October to the thirteen-person committee to prepare the Synod's concluding document.

Notes

References

Living people
1948 births
21st-century Roman Catholic archbishops in Peru
20th-century Roman Catholic bishops in Peru
Roman Catholic archbishops of Trujillo
Bishops appointed by Pope John Paul II